Nijō Tameuji (二条為氏, 1222–1286), also known as Fujiwara no Tameuji (藤原為氏), was a Japanese courtier and waka poet of the mid-Kamakura period. His Dharma name was Kakua (覚阿).

Biography

Ancestry, birth and early life 
Nijō Tameuji was born in 1222. His father was Fujiwara no Tameie, and his mother was a daughter of Utsunomiya Yoritsuna. He was Tameie's eldest son, and a grandson of Fujiwara no Teika. He was not known as Nijō in his early life; he received this moniker from his son Tameyo.

Political career 
At the height of his political career, he had attained the Senior Second Rank, and held the position of Provisional Major Counselor (gon-dainagon).

Later life and death 
He entered Buddhist orders in 1285, acquiring the Dharma name Kakua. He died on 3 October 1286, or the fourteenth day of the ninth month of Kōan 9.

Descendants 
He was the father of Nijō Tameyo, Nijō Tamezane and Nijō Jōi.

Poetry 
Tameuji learned waka composition from his father Tameie and his grandfather Teika, who between them had compiled three of the imperial anthologies. He was the founder of the conservative Nijō poetic school.

In 1247, he took part in the Hyakusanjū-ban Uta-awase (百三十番歌合), and the following year in the Hōji Hyakushu (宝治百首).

In 1278, on the command of Retired Emperor Kameyama, he compiled the Shokushūi Wakashū. He may have also compiled the Shin Wakashū, although other theories as to its compiler's identity have been proposed.

As the heir to the prestigious Mikohidari house, he was a central figure of the waka society of his day. His disagreements with his brother Tamenori and stepmother Abutsu-ni, however, gave rise to the split between the Nijō, Kyōgoku and Reizei poetic schools, the latter two of which were founded by his brothers Tamenori and Tamesuke, respectively. He had a bitter dispute with his stepmother over valuable manuscripts related to the waka traditions, as well as the inheritance of his father's landholdings.

Among his most famous poems is the following, which was included in the Shokugosen Wakashū, compiled by his father Tameie.

He left a private collection, the Dainagon Tameuji-kyō Shū (大納言為氏卿集), which collects the poems of both Tameuji himself and his son Tameyo.

References

Works cited 
 
 
 
 
 
 

1222 births
1286 deaths
Fujiwara clan
Nijō family
13th-century Japanese poets